Bikram Singh Thekedar is a Bharatiya Janata Party (BJP) politician, current Member of Legislative Assembly (MLA) representing Kosli constituency in the Haryana Legislative Assembly, and was sworn-in as Minister of State of Haryana on 26 October 2014. He is also an active social worker. He holds the charge for the following 3 departments:
 Department of Cooperation (Independent Charge), Haryana.
 Department of Printing and Stationery (Independent Charge), Haryana.
 Department of Agriculture (Attached with Agriculture Minister), Haryana.

Personal life
Bikram Singh was born in Gurgaon, Haryana on 10 April 1970 to Dalip Singh and Rajballa. He has one brother and two sisters, with Bikram being the eldest of the four. He completed his graduation from D.A.V College, Ajmer, Rajasthan and is married to Suresh Devi.

References

State cabinet ministers of Haryana
Haryana MLAs 2014–2019
Bharatiya Janata Party politicians from Haryana
Living people
1970 births